The National Council for the Social Studies (NCSS) is a U.S.-based association devoted to supporting social studies education. It is affiliated with various regional or state level social studies associations, including: the Middle States Council for the Social Studies, the Washington State Council for the Social Studies, the New York City UFT Association for the Teaching of Social Studies, the Michigan Council for the Social Studies, Massachusetts Council for the Social Studies, and Virginia Council for the Social Studies. They publish several journals; their flagship publication being a peer-reviewed journal titled Social Education which, according to their website, aims to strike "a balance of theoretical content and practical teaching ideas." They sponsor the high school honor society Rho Kappa.

NCSS is currently a member of the National Coalition Against Censorship.

History
Founded in 1921, NCSS engages and supports educators in strengthening and advocating social studies. With members in all the 50 states, the District of Columbia, and 69 foreign countries, NCSS serves as an umbrella organization for elementary, secondary, and college teachers of history, geography, economics, political science, sociology, psychology, anthropology, and law-related education. Organized into a network of more than 110 affiliated state, local, and regional councils and associated groups, the NCSS membership represents K–12 classroom teachers, college and university faculty members, curriculum designers and specialists, social studies supervisors, and leaders in the various disciplines that constitute the social studies.

Social Studies
NCSS defines social studies as "the integrated study of the social sciences and humanities to promote civic competence." Within the school program, social studies provides coordinated, systematic study drawing upon such disciplines as anthropology, archaeology, economics, geography, history, law, philosophy, political science, psychology, religion, and sociology, as well as appropriate content from the humanities, mathematics, and natural sciences. In essence, social studies promotes knowledge of and involvement in civic affairs. And because civic issues—such as health care, crime, and foreign policy—are multidisciplinary in nature, understanding these issues and developing resolutions to them requires multidisciplinary education. These characteristics are the key defining aspects of social studies.

Expectations of Excellence
In 2010, the council published National Curriculum Standards for Social Studies: A Framework for Teaching, Learning and Assessment. This publication is an update and revision of Expectations of Excellence: Curriculum Standards for Social Studies originally published in 1994. The National Curriculum Standards provides an articulated K–12 social studies program that serves as a framework for the integration of other national standards in social studies, including U.S. and world history, civics and government, geography, global education, and economics. NCSS standards ensure that an integrated social science, behavioral science, and humanities approach for achieving academic and civic competence is available to guide social studies decision makers in K–12 schools.

The NCSS framework consists of ten themes incorporating fields of study that correspond with one or more relevant disciplines. The organization believes that effective social studies programs include experiences that provide for the study of: Culture; Time, Continuity, and Change; People, Places, and Environments; Individual Development and Identity; Individuals, Groups, and Institutions; Power, Authority, and Governance; Production, Distribution, and Consumption; Science, Technology, and Society; Global Connections; and Civic Ideals and Practices.

Awards
The NCSS gives a number of awards including:
 Outstanding Social Studies Teacher of the Year Awards – "recognize exceptional classroom social studies teachers for grades K-6, 5-8, and 7-12 who teach social studies regularly and systematically in elementary school settings, and at least half-time in middle or junior high and high school settings."
 Award for Global Understanding Given in Honor of James M. Becker – "recognizes a social studies educator (or a team of educators) who has made notable contributions in helping social studies students increase their understanding of the world."
 FASSE Christa McAuliffe Reach for the Stars Award – "to help a social studies educator make his or her dream of innovative social studies a reality. Grants will be given to assist classroom teachers in: 1) developing and implementing imaginative, innovative, and illustrative social studies teaching strategies; and 2) supporting student implementation of innovative social studies, citizenship projects, field experiences, and community connections."
 NCSS Research Awards – "NCSS and the Research Committee sponsor three annual research awards designed to recognize substantive scholarly inquiry in social studies education."
 Carter G. Woodson Book Awards – "presented to exemplary books written for children and young people each year at the NCSS Annual Conference."

See also

 New England History Teachers' Association

References

External links
 NCSS
 Social studies conference

Professional associations based in the United States
Organizations established in 1921
Social sciences organizations
Geographic societies
Educational organizations based in the United States